David Rock (born in Sunderland, 1929) is an English architect and graphic designer, twice RIBA vice-president (1986-87 & 1995-97) and RIBA president (1997–99).

From school, Rock went to the Newcastle University School of Architecture, Planning and Landscape (then part of Durham University) 1947–52. He studied under Lord Holford and Peter Smithson who described him as "the most naturally gifted and talented architect he'd ever met". He then worked for Basil Spence for five years. He joined Grenfell Baines & Hargreaves in 1959 as Associate Partner to open its first London office; this office initially operated out of Rock's flat in Earls Court. Rock was responsible for BDP London during the 1960s, becoming an Equity Partner in 1964; he resigned in 1971.

Rock went into partnership with John Townsend, an expert on bürolandschaft. In 1972, Rock Townsend opened, what would become, Workspace, which further developed the idea of multidisciplinary working by providing office space for small design businesses.

Rock was a supporter of the radical architecture group Archigram in the 1960s and 1970s. He nominated them for the RIBA Royal Gold Medal which they received in 2002.

References

Modernist architects from England
1929 births
Living people
Alumni of King's College, Newcastle
People educated at Bede Grammar School for Boys
Presidents of the Royal Institute of British Architects
English graphic designers